Tour France is a residential skyscraper located in La Défense business district and in Puteaux, France, west of Paris.

Built in 1973, the tower is one of the tallest residential towers in France, with a height of 126 metres. The tower is located on the banks of the Seine and offers a panorama over the historical center of Paris.

See also 
 List of tallest structures in Paris

External links 
 Tour France (Emporis)

France
France
Residential skyscrapers
Apartment buildings in France
Office buildings completed in 1973
Residential buildings completed in 1973